The 2016 All-Ireland Senior Ladies' Football Championship is the 43rd edition of the Ladies' Gaelic Football Association's premier inter-county Ladies' Gaelic Football tournament. It is known for sponsorship reasons as the TG4 All-Ireland Senior Ladies' Football Championship.

Cork were the defending champions and successfully defended their title beating Dublin in the final on 25 September 2016. The 2016 attendance of 34,445 was a new record.

Format

Provincial Championships

Connacht, Leinster, Munster and Ulster each organise their provincial championship. Each province determines the format for deciding their champions and it may be league, group, knock-out, double-elimination, etc. or a combination. For clarity, the format is explained in the provincial sections below.

Qualifiers

All teams except the provincial champions enter the All-Ireland qualifiers. The final four qualifier winners re-enter the All-Ireland championship at the quarterfinal stage. All matches are knock-out.

All-Ireland

The four provincial champions play the four winners from the qualifiers in the All-Ireland quarterfinals with the winners progressing to the semifinals. The final is normally played on the fourth Sunday in September. All matches are knock-out.

Provincial championships

Connacht Championship

Connacht Format

As only two teams enter, a knock-out final is played.

Connacht Final

Leinster Championship

Leinster Format

Four Leinster teams (Dublin, Laois, Meath and Westmeath) compete in an initial group stage. Each team plays all the other teams once in three rounds of two matches. The top two teams advance to the final.

Leinster Group Stage

Leinster Round 1
Dublin	3-15 – 0-4 Laois	
Meath	2-14 – 5-21 Westmeath

Leinster Round 2

Laois	3-6 – 2-9 Meath
Westmeath 1-4	– 4-12 Dublin

Leinster Round 3

Laois 1-11 – 2-12 Westmeath
Meath	2-4 – 3-19 Dublin

Table
 Dublin (6 pts)
 Westmeath (4)
 Laois (1)
 Meath (1)

Leinster Final

Munster Championship

Munster Format

Three Munster teams (Cork, Kerry and Waterford) compete in an initial group stage. The top two teams advance to the final.

Munster Group Stage

Munster Final

Ulster Championship

Ulster Format

Four teams compete in two semifinals and a final. All matches are knockout.

Ulster Semifinals

Ulster Final

Qualifiers

Qualifiers Format

All the teams except the provincial champions enter the qualifiers. A preliminary round is held to reduce the number of teams to eight who then play four matches. All matches are knock-out.

The four winners play the four provincial champions in the All-Ireland quarterfinals.

Qualifiers Preliminary Round

Qualifiers Last Eight

All-Ireland

All-Ireland Quarterfinals

The four provincial champions play the four winners from the qualifiers.

All-Ireland Semifinals

All-Ireland final

References